Eyewitness News is a style of television presentation that emphasizes visual elements and action videos, replacing the older "man-on-camera" newscast.

History

Pioneered by Westinghouse 
The earliest known use of the Eyewitness News name in American television was on April 6, 1959, when KYW-TV (now WKYC-TV) – at the time, based in Cleveland and owned by Westinghouse Broadcasting – launched the nation's first 90-minute local newscast (under the title Eyewitness), which was combined with the then 15-minute national newscast. The name was then adopted for use by Westinghouse's other television stations – KPIX in San Francisco; WJZ-TV in Baltimore; WBZ-TV in Boston; and KDKA-TV in Pittsburgh – for their local newscasts.

After the KYW-TV call letters, management, and some staffers moved from Cleveland to Philadelphia in 1965 the station's then-news director, Al Primo, created the Eyewitness News format. In this format, which was meant to be faster in pace than the standard newscast format (in which an anchor simply read headlines), a reporter in the field would be the "eyewitness" to a news event to the anchor in the studio and the viewer at home. The anchors became personalities instead of presenters with the introduction of banter, or "happy talk" as it was named by Al Primo. Anchors would give their own personal comments in between stories to let viewers know their personalities.

Primo used the cue 007 from the 1963 film From Russia with Love as the musical theme. The format quickly became a hit in Philadelphia and allowed KYW-TV to surge past longtime leader WCAU-TV for first place, a position it kept on and off until the late 1970s. KYW-TV's success inspired rival station WFIL-TV (now WPVI-TV) to develop the Action News format to compete with it (after NBC was ordered to re-assume control of its Cleveland broadcasting properties in 1965, the Eyewitness News name left that city until WEWS adopted it for its newscasts in the 1970s).

KYW-TV used the name and format until 1991, and re-adopted it in 1998. All five major stations owned by Westinghouse prior to its 1995 acquisition of CBS have used Eyewitness News as their newscast title at some point in time; as of October 23, 2017, only KYW-TV continues to do so.

Expansion to ABC 
In 1968, Primo moved to WABC-TV in New York City and took the Eyewitness News concept there with him, choosing music from the 1967 Paul Newman film Cool Hand Luke – the "Tar Sequence" cue (composed by Lalo Schifrin) – as the theme. However, he added a new twist at WABC-TV – light, informal-sounding conversation among the anchors between the news stories and segments, which came to be known as "happy talk". Among the newscasters in the first wave of happy talk on WABC-TV was young reporter Geraldo Rivera, a comical and entertaining weatherman in Tex Antoine, and Bill Beutel and Roger Grimsby as anchormen of contrasting yet complementing styles. Primo also criticized the then-standard practice of "three white men" "preaching the news" at viewers and included women and persons of color to reflect the diversity of the viewing audience. WABC-TV has kept the name and format since then, and has been the highest-rated station in New York City for much of that time.

The format, as modified by WABC-TV, was copied by many other stations in the United States, with four other stations owned and operated by ABC – KABC-TV in Los Angeles, WLS-TV in Chicago, WXYZ-TV in Detroit and KGO-TV in San Francisco – using both the format and the Cool Hand Luke theme (in the case of KGO, since KPIX was already using the Eyewitness News name, KGO titled its newscasts as Channel 7 NewsScene in 1969 and by 1983 simply Channel 7 News, while WXYZ used the Action News name since rival WJBK-TV was using the Eyewitness News name for its newscasts; KABC and WLS were free to use the Eyewitness News name as did WABC-TV). Ironically, WPVI, which developed the Action News format, is also now an ABC owned-and-operated station.

In addition, U.S. Spanish-language stations also use their own version of Eyewitness News, called Noticias de Primera Plana (Headline News, a concept translation in Spanish of Eyewitness News) on certain owned-and-operated stations of Spanish networks.

A separate, but mostly unrelated, Eyewitness News format was developed by Irv Weinstein in Buffalo, New York for WKBW-TV. This format was mostly based not on the original Eyewitness News (though it used the same logo; in actuality, a slightly modified version of it) but rather on the Action News format of its sister stations in the Capital Cities Communications stable. While based on Action Newss brief and numerous reports, Weinstein built his Eyewitness News newscast around attention-grabbing catchphrases and alliterative headlines, along with occasional wisecracking or sarcastic one-liners about the day's news stories.

This version of Eyewitness News was used on WKBW as well as other Capital Cities stations where the Action News name was in use by another station, such as WTVD in Durham, North Carolina. It was also used on a few stations not owned by Capital Cities, including WOKR (now WHAM-TV) in Rochester, New York. Despite its familiarity as a format on ABC owned-and-operated stations, it is actually CBS that owns the rights to the Eyewitness News name, as it originated from KYW-TV.

WKBW dropped the Eyewitness News brand in 2022, as its owner, The E. W. Scripps Company, was convinced the brand was outdated.

Outside the United States 
In Mexico and other Latin American countries during the 1970s and 1980s, some local newscasts also used the Eyewitness News format, under the names Noticias de Primera Plana (Headline News) and Noticias de Acción (Action News).

The title was used in Canada, on CTV affiliate CFRN-TV in Edmonton.

In Indonesia, Metro TV branded its newscasts as iWitness, and abbreviated as Eyewitness. It has since become one of the featured segments on the daytime news program Wide Shot.

In Australia, BTQ-7 in Brisbane adopted the Eyewitness News branding in the early 1970s. The branding was also employed by NWS-9 in Adelaide for its evening newscast. TEN-10 in Sydney and ATV-0 in Melbourne, the principal stations of Network Ten, adopted the Eyewitness News branding in the mid-1970s and it was later adopted by other stations in the Network Ten group (SAS-10 (later SAS-7) in 1976 and TVQ-0 (later TVQ-10) in 1978) as BTQ-7 and NWS-9 later relinquished the brand. Regional affiliates for Network Ten including CTC-7 in Canberra (Ten Capital Eyewitness News, formerly Capital 7 Eyewitness News, Capital Television Eyewitness News and Ten National News), Southern Cross Network in Victoria (Southern Cross/TV8 Eyewitness News formerly TV8 Newshour), and QTV in Townsville (QTV Eyewitness News and later Ten North Queensland Eyewitness News), also used the Eyewitness News name. The Australian version of Eyewitness News more closely resembled Weinstein's version than the original format, but it became one of the ratings winners in the 1980s due to its one-hour duration unlike other newscasts. Network Ten dropped the use of the Eyewitness News name in September 1988 (but retained it in Brisbane until October 31, 1988 on TVQ-10) but later reinstated it in July 1989 for six months, and then again in January 1991 until late 1994, this time using its present logo. Network Ten reinstated the "Eyewitness News" branding once again on September 16, 2013 and was later retired on October 31, 2018 as part of a network relaunch and has since been replaced with 10 News First.

In South Africa, Eyewitness News is used by Eyewitness News, located in Johannesburg and in Cape Town.  It is also used by Talk Radio 702 and 94.7 Highveld Stereo in Gauteng, 567 CapeTalk and 94.5 Kfm in Cape Town.

United States stations that use or have used the Eyewitness News format or name 
 1Indicates station was originally owned by Westinghouse Broadcasting and now is owned-and-operated by CBS
 2Indicates station is owned-and-operated by ABC

References

External links 

TV Newscast Titles – listings of other stations that have used the Eyewitness News name
CBS3 Eyewitness News Team – unofficial site documenting the development of Eyewitness News at KYW-TV

Franchised television formats
Local news programming in the United States
1950s neologisms